Crownthorpe is a locality split between the South Burnett Region and the Gympie Region, in Queensland, Australia. In the  Crownthorpe had a population of 41 people.

History 
Crownthorpe Provisional School opened on 1 September 1914. On 1 December 1914 it became Crownethorpe State School. It closed in 1952.

In the  Crownthorpe had a population of 41 people.

References 

South Burnett Region
Gympie Region
Localities in Queensland